The 2020 PCS season was the first year of the Pacific Championship Series (PCS), a professional esports league for the MOBA PC game League of Legends. The PCS was created in late 2019 as a merger between the League of Legends Master Series (LMS) and League of Legends SEA Tour (LST).

The spring regular season was initially set to begin on 8 February but was postponed until further notice on 29 January due to the global COVID-19 pandemic. It was later announced on 18 February that the 2020 season would officially begin on 29 February.

The spring split began with the first day of the spring regular season on 29 February and concluded with the spring finals on 3 May. The summer split began with the first day of the summer regular season on 20 June and concluded with the summer finals on 30 August.

Talon Esports was the PCS' representative at the 2020 Mid-Season Showdown. Machi Esports and PSG Talon were the PCS' first and second seeds, respectively, at the 2020 World Championship.

Spring

Teams and rosters 
G-Rex was originally announced as one of the PCS' ten franchise partners, but on 25 September 2019 it was announced that the team had disbanded and forfeited its spot in the PCS as a result of internal restructuring by their parent company Emperor Esports Stars. Five days later, Machi Esports was announced as G-Rex's replacement.

Regular season standings 
 Format: Double round robin, best-of-one

Playoffs 
 Format: Double elimination
 Top two teams qualify for the 2020 Mid-Season Showdown

Ranking

Summer

Teams and rosters 
Prior to the start of the summer split, Talon Esports announced that its League of Legends team had partnered with PSG Esports and would henceforth compete as PSG Talon.

Regular season standings 
 Format: Double round robin, best-of-one

Playoffs 
 Format: Double elimination
 Top two teams qualify for the 2020 World Championship

Ranking

References 

League of Legends
2020 multiplayer online battle arena tournaments
Pacific Championship Series seasons
Pacific Championship Series season, 2020